Alleniella is a genus of mosses belonging to the family Neckeraceae.

The genus was first described by S.Olsson, Enroth and D. Quandt in 2011.

Taxonomy
The genus name of Alleniella is in honour of Bruce Hampton Allen (b. 1952), American bryologist. It was published in Taxon Vol.60 (Issue 1) on page 45 in 2011.

Species
 Alleniella besseri (Lobarzewski) S. Olsson, Enroth & D. Quandt
 Alleniella brownii (Dixon) S. Olsson, Enroth & D. Quandt
 Alleniella chilensis (Schimp. ex Mont.) S. Olsson, Enroth & D. Quandt
 Alleniella complanata (Hedw.) S. Olsson, Enroth & D. Quandt
 Alleniella hymenodonta (Müll. Hal.) S. Olsson, Enroth & D. Quandt
 Alleniella remota (Bruch & Schimp. ex Müll. Hal.) S. Olsson, Enroth & D. Quandt
 Alleniella scabridens (Müll. Hal.) S. Olsson, Enroth & D. Quandt
 Alleniella submacrocarpa (Dixon) S. Olsson, Enroth & D. Quandt
 Alleniella urnigera (Müll. Hal.) S. Olsson, Enroth & D. Quandt
 Alleniella valentiniana (Besch.) S. Olsson, Enroth & D. Quandt

References

Neckeraceae
Moss genera